Bukiniczia cabulica is a plant in the plumbago or leadwort family, Plumbaginaceae. It is the sole species in the monotypic genus Bukiniczia.  It is a biennial native to Afghanistan and Pakistan.  It forms a basal rosette of leathery leaves, growing a stem with pink flowers in its second year.

References

Monotypic Caryophyllales genera
Plumbaginaceae
Taxa named by Pierre Edmond Boissier
Taxa named by Igor Lintchevski
Flora of Afghanistan
Flora of Pakistan